Tavaq (also Romanized as Ţavaq) is a village in Kolah Boz-e Sharqi Rural District of the Central District of Mianeh County, East Azerbaijan province, Iran. At the 2006 National Census, its population was 2,026 in 415 households. The following census in 2011 counted 2,299 people in 608 households. The latest census in 2016 showed a population of 1,961 people in 573 households; it was the largest village in its rural district.

References 

Meyaneh County

Populated places in East Azerbaijan Province

Populated places in Meyaneh County